Gorgodze is a Georgian surname. Notable people with the surname include:

Ekaterine Gorgodze (born 1991), Georgian tennis player
Mamuka Gorgodze (born 1984), Georgian rugby union player

Georgian-language surnames